Lana Jennifer Lokteff (born March 14, 1979) is an American far-right, antisemitic conspiracy theorist and white supremacist, who is part of the alt-right movement. She became a prominent YouTube personality before being banned. She is the host of Radio 3Fourteen.

Early life 
Lokteff was born in Oregon and is of Russian descent. Her parents were immigrants.

Career 

In 2011, she married Henrik Palmgren, the Swedish host of web media company Red Ice. According to the Southern Poverty Law Center, Red Ice started in 2003 covering the paranormal and conspiracy theories before shifting to white nationalism and antisemitism. Lokteff and Palmgren have been jointly cited as an influential introduction to white nationalism by members of the far-right. Red Ice shifted around 2012 in response to what the couple perceived as "anti-white sentiment" coinciding with the Black Lives Matter movement.

Lokteff has denied the Holocaust and the Native American genocide. She has publicized the work of denialist historians such as David Cole and Mark Weber.

Following the election of Donald Trump in 2016, Lokteff has attempted to increase the number of white women involved in the predominantly male-dominated alt-right movement, advocating for them to play a supporting role to men. Lokteff opposes feminism, claiming that it has made life more difficult for men and that feminism's goals of equality have already been achieved. She has also criticized some of the women who have accused Harvey Weinstein of sexual assault. New York magazine describes her as a "looks-obsessed eugenicist", quoting her as saying "The alt-right is a very attractive, very sexy bunch ... Matches are being made left and right of beautiful, intelligent couples. It's a eugenic process."

In 2018, Lokteff was a guest on the podcast of a Florida schoolteacher who used the pseudonym Tiana Dalichov. She used the podcast to encourage white nationalists to become schoolteachers to influence children.

In October 2019, Red Ice TV's YouTube channel was banned by YouTube for hate speech violations. The channel had about 330,000 subscribers. Lokteff and Red Ice promoted a backup channel in an attempt to circumvent the ban. A week later, the backup channel was also removed by YouTube. In November 2019, Facebook banned Red Ice from using its platform.

Personal life 
Lokteff identifies as a pagan. She lives in Charleston, South Carolina. She says she has been trolled and threatened by men in the alt-right.

References

External links
 

Alt-right writers
Critics of Black Lives Matter
Living people
Female critics of feminism
American YouTubers
1979 births
Portland State University alumni
Writers from Portland, Oregon
American conspiracy theorists
American white supremacists
American Holocaust deniers
American people of Russian descent
People from Oregon
American modern pagans
American women podcasters
Right-wing politics in the United States
American eugenicists